The 2004 Appalachian State Mountaineers football team represented Appalachian State University as a member of the Southern Conference (SoCON) during in the 2004 NCAA Division I-AA football season. Led by 16th-year head coach Jerry Moore, the Mountaineers compiled an overall record of 6–5 with a mark of 4–3 in conference play, placing second in the SoCon. The low point of the season was a 30–27 loss to rival Western Carolina in the Battle for the Old Mountain Jug. Home games were played at Kidd Brewer Stadium in Boone, North Carolina.

Schedule

References
General
 

Specific

Appalachian State
Appalachian State Mountaineers football seasons
Appalachian State Mountaineers football